The Bay Hill Club & Lodge is a private golf club and hotel in the southeastern United States, located in Bay Hill, Florida, a suburb southwest of Orlando.

The first 18 holes at Bay Hill (Champion and Challenger nines) were designed by Dick Wilson in 1961, and were built by Bob Simmons. Considered one of Wilson's best works, the course illustrates his typical approach of slightly elevating the putting surfaces to improve visibility and drainage. Simmons designed and built the additional 9 holes (Charger nine) after Wilson's death. 

There are 27 holes of golf available: the Challenger, Champion and Charger nines. It was owned by Arnold Palmer from 1974 until his death in 2016, and now by his daughter and son-in-law Amy & Roy Saunders. Bay Hill Club & Lodge also offers a 69-room Lodge, 6 guest cottages, the Arnold Palmer Golf Academy and various amenities such as tennis, instructional golf lessons, Spa & Fitness Center, and marina. You must be a member or registered Lodge guest to have access to the golf course and all Club amenities. The Golf Shop is open to the public.

Arnold Palmer Invitational 
Since 1979, Bay Hill Club & Lodge has hosted the Arnold Palmer Invitational, a tournament on the PGA Tour. The event is held annually each March.

Scorecard

References

External links

PGA Tour: Arnold Palmer Invitational

Golf clubs and courses in Greater Orlando
Sports venues in Orange County, Florida
Arnold Palmer
1961 establishments in Florida
Sports venues completed in 1961